Derevnya stantsii Sakharozavodskaya (Şäkär zavodı stantsiyahı) is a rural locality (a village) in Pribelsky Selsoviet, Karmaskalinsky District, Bashkortostan, Russia. The population was 82 as of 2010. There is 1 street.

Geography 
The village is located 22 km east of Karmaskaly (the district's administrative centre) by road. Pokrovka is the nearest rural locality.

References 

Rural localities in Karmaskalinsky District